Igor Novikov (19 October 1929 – 30 August 2007) was a Soviet modern pentathlete and Olympic Champion. He competed at the 1956 Summer Olympics in Melbourne, where he won a gold medal in the team competition (together with Aleksandr Tarasov and Ivan Deryugin. He won a silver medal at the 1960 Summer Olympics in Rome, and he competed at the 1964 Summer Olympics in Tokyo, where he won a gold medal in the team competition (together with Albert Mokeyev and Viktor Mineyev), and a silver medal in the individual competition.

After retiring from competitions, Novikov worked as a modern pentathlon coach and administrator. Between 1977 and 1991 he was president of the Soviet Modern Pentathlon Federation, and from 1988 to 1992 president of the Union Internationale de Pentathlon Moderne.

References

1929 births
2007 deaths
Soviet male modern pentathletes
Olympic modern pentathletes of the Soviet Union
Modern pentathletes at the 1952 Summer Olympics
Modern pentathletes at the 1956 Summer Olympics
Modern pentathletes at the 1960 Summer Olympics
Modern pentathletes at the 1964 Summer Olympics
Olympic gold medalists for the Soviet Union
Olympic silver medalists for the Soviet Union
Olympic medalists in modern pentathlon
Russian sports coaches
Medalists at the 1964 Summer Olympics
Medalists at the 1960 Summer Olympics
Medalists at the 1956 Summer Olympics
Burials at Serafimovskoe Cemetery